Shire is a village in India, situated in the Mawal taluka of Pune district in the state of Maharashtra.

Administration
The village is administrated by a sarpanch, an elected representative who leads a gram panchayat. At the time of the 2011 Census of India, the gram panchayat governed three villages and was based at Ambale.

Demographics
At the 2011 census, the village comprised 66 households. The population of 346 was split between 186 males and 160 females.

See also
List of villages in Mawal taluka

References

Villages in Mawal taluka